is manga, anime and novel box set. It is a collaboration between Aniplex, ASCII Media Works and Kadokawa Shoten, with animation production by Madhouse.

Characters
Yakusa  
Hoshigaoka  
Hongō  
Ichimiya  
Arata  
 Kirishima Voiced by: Ryōhei Kimura
 Sakyōyama Voiced by: Junichi Yanagita
 Ikeshita Voiced by: Kaito Ishikawa
 Chikusa Voiced by: Mikako Komatsu

References

External links
Official website 
 

2012 anime OVAs
2012 Japanese novels
2012 manga
Japanese science fiction novels
Madhouse (company)
Science fiction anime and manga
Anime and manga about time travel
Aniplex
ASCII Media Works
Kadokawa Shoten
Kadokawa Dwango franchises